Kisan Kanya was a 1937 Hindi Cinecolor feature film which was directed by Moti Gidwani and produced by Ardeshir Irani of Imperial Pictures. It is largely remembered by the Indian public on account of it being India's first indigenously made colour film.

V. Shantaram had earlier produced a Marathi film Sairandhri (1933) which had scenes in color. However, the film was processed and printed in Germany Kisan Kanya was, therefore, India's first indigenously made color film.
Kisan Kanya was based on a novel by Saadat Hasan Manto and focussed on the plight of poor farmers.

Cast
 Padma Devi as Bansri
 Jilloo as Ramdai
 Ghulam Mohammed as Randheer
 Nissar as Ramu
 Syed Ahmed as Muneem
 Gani Gani as the Zamindar (landlord)

Production 
Film pioneer Ardeshir Irani, who had produced notable films as Nala Damayanti (1920) which was India's first international co-production (with Italy) and India's first talkie Alam Ara (1931) conceived the idea of producing a color film. The result of his efforts was the color film Kisan Kanya made with the Cinecolor process whose process rights Irani had obtained from an American company. The film performed moderately at the box-office. Kisan Kanya was based on a novel by Saadat Hasan Manto and focused on the plight of poor farmers.

Songs 
The film had music by Ram Gopal Pandey, and had ten songs:

Trivia
 The first Indian color film to be made entirely in India (the earlier Sairandhri (1933) was processed and printed in Germany). This film was also more favorably received than its predecessor.

References

External links
 
 Kisan Kanya on indiancine.ma

Cinecolor films
1930s Hindi-language films
1930s color films
1937 films
Films based on Indian novels
Indian drama films
1937 drama films
Hindi-language drama films
Saadat Hasan Manto